Aphrodite Hills is a coastal resort in Cyprus located in the Paphos district.  It is named after the goddess Aphrodite and the resort is only one mile away from Aphrodite's Rock.

The resort is built on two elevated plateaus divided by a natural ravine. The resort has many features of a Mediterranean town; Greco-Roman architecture is prominent, locally quarried stone is used in buildings and the town square has a market, restaurants, souvenir shops, a chapel, fragrant gardens, splashing fountains and an art gallery. The resort also has a spa, golf course, and leisure facilities. Most of the landscaping vegetation and development in the resort has been planned in advance, and as a result, the resort is spacious and lacks the typical sprawl and density of most villages in Cyprus. 

In 2020, Aphrodite Hills hosted the Cyprus Open and the Cyprus Showdown, two back-to-back one-off European Tour golf tournaments added to fill the 2020 season schedule as many regular tournaments were cancelled due to the COVID-19 pandemic.

Facilities
The Retreat Spa was built in a classic Greco-Roman style and enhanced by the Thermae. The spa was named in the world's top 10 by Condé Nast Traveller, and in 2008 it received the highest accolade in the spa industry by winning "The Best Spa in Europe" award at the 2008 Professional Beauty Awards.

The resort has an 18-hole golf course (230–hectare) of championship standard. In fact, Aphrodite Hills Resort has recently been licensed to become the PGA National Cyprus, joining the PGA family of other well-known resorts worldwide. 
Most of the holes have views over the Mediterranean. Its 7th hole has become a talking point among golfers worldwide. Golfers, golf clubs, and landscape designers have ranked it as among the very finest courses in Europe." There are multi purpose courts and training facilities which attract sports teams from across Europe.

Aphrodite Hills hosts West End shows, festivities, cultural events, and other plays.

Awards
Aphrodite Hills has received two international listings in 2010. The InterContinental Aphrodite Hills Resort Hotel and The Retreat spa were both listed in Condé Nast Traveller'''s Gold Lists for 2010.

The InterContinental Aphrodite Hills Resort Hotel was named 'Best European Hotel for Leisure Activities' in Condé Nast Traveller'''s 2010 Gold List.
Moreover, The Retreat Spa was named third best Hotel Spa in Europe, Asia Minor and the Russian Federation, at the Condé Nast Traveller Readers' Spa Awards and was also listed in the publication's 2010 Gold List for the Best Spas.

See also
Kouklia
Polis, Cyprus
Coral Bay, Cyprus
Cypriot wine

References
 

Kouklia
Golf clubs and courses in Cyprus